A VODnet is a Video On Demand-driven cable and satellite television network.  It is a non-linear television network in that the content resides on a server and the consumer calls up the particular program they want to watch from a digital menu. This is in contrast to a linear network that shows scheduled programs throughout the day.  Usually VODnets are genre portal based.  For example,  Sportskool and The Ski Channel would be found under "Sports" and MGM Channel would be under "Movies."

Currently, all major cable, satellite and telco distributors and most mid-size cable operators carry VODnets.

The majority of VODnets launched in 2007 and 2008.

VODnets include:
 FEARnet
 MGM Channel 
 ExerciseTV 
 The Ski Channel 
 Lifeskool  formerly Mag Rack
 Wheels TV  
 Karaoke Channel		
 Havoc TV  
 Music Choice
 Studio 4 Fitness
 Concert TV 
 EuroCinema
 Film Festival
 Anime Network
 Players Network

Criteria

Traditional Cable Networks that have VOD Video On Demand are not considered a VODnet because VOD is not the main distribution method for the channel.  For example, Speed Channel which has VOD programming available through most cable and satellite providers, would not be considered a VODnet because their main distribution method is linear.

Important Facts

In March 2008, ExerciseTV reached its 100 millionth view.  In October, 2008, Mag Rack was split into two companies, Lifeskool and Sportskool, and sold by Rainbow Media, a subsidiary of Cablevision to new owners.  Shortly thereafter Lifeskool additionally purchased Concert TV and began using the name Mag Rack again.

In early 2009 Ripe Digital Entertainment went bankrupt.  They had supposedly raised over $50 million, but spent lavishly and were the victim of poor timing. ExerciseTV ceased distribution in November, 2011, and was replaced on Time Warner Cable by Sportskool Fit, a new channel created by Sportskool.

External links
 , Music Choice official site
 , The Ski Channel official site
 , Lifeskool official site
 RipeTV, Ripe TV official site
  Story on MGM Channel
 , Sportskool official site

Video on demand